Taishi (written: , , ,  or ) is a masculine Japanese given name. Notable people with the name include:

, Japanese footballer
, Japanese sumo wrestler
, Japanese footballer
, Japanese voice actor
, Japanese actor
, Japanese volleyball player
, Japanese footballer
, Japanese professional wrestler
, Japanese footballer

Japanese masculine given names